Benjamin Pintol (born 19 May 1990) is a Bosnian professional footballer who most recently played for SC Fortuna Köln.

References

External links
 
 
 Auf dem Weg zu alter Stärke: Benjamin Pintol im Porträt (Bio) - Fortuna Köln 

1990 births
Living people
Footballers from Sarajevo
Association football forwards
Bosnia and Herzegovina footballers
FSV Frankfurt players
SV Eintracht Trier 05 players
Eintracht Frankfurt II players
Kickers Offenbach players
Hallescher FC players
SC Fortuna Köln players
2. Bundesliga players
3. Liga players
Bosnia and Herzegovina expatriate footballers
Expatriate footballers in Germany
Bosnia and Herzegovina expatriate sportspeople in Germany